The Sfire or Sefire steles are three 8th-century BCE basalt stelae containing Aramaic inscriptions discovered near Al-Safirah ("Sfire") near Aleppo, Syria. The Sefire treaty inscriptions are the three inscriptions on the steles; they are known as KAI 222-224. A fourth stele, possibly from Sfire, is known as KAI 227 (the "Starcky Tablet", at the Louvre).

Discovery of the inscriptions

Sefire I 
Discovered in 1930, it is held in the National Museum of Damascus. This is a basalt slab broken in two horizontally. The first two steles each have three faces bearing writing.

Sefire II 
Discovered in 1930, it is held in the National Museum of Damascus. As with Sefire I stele, Sefire II had three faces bearing writing. While most of the text of Sefire II A and B permit coherent translation only with comparison with Sefire I and III, the concluding portion of Sefire II A and B is quite clear.

Sefire III
Discovered in 1956, Sefire III is made up of nine fragments of the reverse of a broad slab. It is held by the Beirut National Museum.

The inscriptions
The inscriptions record two treaties that "list curses and magical rites which take effect if the treaty is violated."

One is a treaty between two minor kings, Barga'yah and Matti'el, who hailed from the southwestern periphery of the Assyrian empire. In the text, Matti'el swears to accept dire consequences for himself and his cities should he violate the stipulations of the treaty:

"....
As this wax is consumed by fire, thus Ma[tti'el] shall be consumed b[y fi]re.
As this bow and these arrows are broken, thus Inurta and Hadad (= names of local deities) shall break [the bow of Matti'el] and the bows of his nobles.
As a man of wax is blinded, thus Matti'el shall be blinded.
[As] this calf is cut up, thus Matti'el and his nobles shall be cut up."

This loyalty oath from the Sefire inscriptions is similar to other loyalty oaths imposed by Assyrian kings on other less powerful monarchs in the Levant throughout the 8th and 7th centuries BCE.

The inscriptions may, under one possible interpretation, record the names of El and Elyon, "God, God Most High" possibly providing prima facie evidence for a distinction between the two deities first worshipped by the Jebusites in Jerusalem, and then elsewhere throughout the ancient Levant.

Thought to be reflective of Assyrian or neo-Assyrian culture and similar to other documents dating from the first millennium BCE, scholars such as Joseph Fitzmyer have perceived Canaanite influences in the text, while Dennis McCarthy has noted similarities to second millennium BCE treaties imposed by Hittite kings on Syrian vassals.

Identification of the treaty kings 
Two treaties conducted between minor kings from the Kingdom of Arpad inscribed on the stelae are often cited as evidence of the Aramaean tradition of treaty-making. The Sefire inscriptions are of interest to those studying beliefs and practices in ancient Syria and Palestine and the text is considered notable for constituting "the best extrabiblical source for West Semitic traditions of covenantal blessings and curses."

They tell of "The treaty of King Bar-ga'yah of K[a]t[a]k, with Mati'el son of Attarsamak, king of Arpad." Some have identified this as the treaty of "Ashurnerari V" (Adad-nirari III or his son Tiglath-pileser III?) of Assyria and Matiilu (unknown) of Arpad (probably modern Tel Rifaat, Syria).

Gallery

References

Bibliography

Steles I and II
 Dussaud René. Nouvelles inscriptions araméennes de Séfiré, près d'Alep. In: Comptes rendus des séances de l'Académie des Inscriptions et Belles-Lettres, 75ᵉ année, N. 4, 1931. pp. 312-321. DOI : https://doi.org/10.3406/crai.1931.76102
 Ronzevalle, S., "Fragments d'inscriptions araméennes des environs d'Alep." Mélanges de l'Université Saint-Joseph, 15 (1930-31): 237–60
 Cantineau, Jean, "Remarques sur la stèle araméenne de Sefiré-Soudjin." RA 28 (1931): 167–178
 Hempel, J. and Bauer, H., "Zeitschriftenschau: Mélanges de l'Université Saint-Joseph. Beyrouth (Liban) XV (1930)." ZAW 50 (1932): 178–83
 Driver, G.R., "Notes on the Aramaic Inscription from Soudschin." AfO 8 (1932-33): 203–6
 Friedrich, J. and Landsberger, B., "Zu der altaramäischen Stele von Sudschin." ZA 41 (1933): 313–18

Stele III
 Dupont-Sommer, A. and Starcky, Jean, "Une inscription araméenne inédite de Sfiré." BMB 13 (1956 [appeared 1958]): 23–41 + pls. I-VI. Sf.3
 Dupont-Sommer, A., "Une stèle araméenne inédite de Sfiré (Syrie) du VIIIe siècle avant J.-C.." CRAIBL (1957a): 245–48. Sf.3
 Fitzmyer, Joseph A., "The Aramaic Suzerainty Treaty from Sefire in the Museum of Beirut." CBQ 20 (1958): 444–76. Sf.3

All Steles
 Dupont-Sommer André. Les inscriptions araméennes de Sfiré (stèles I et II). In: Mémoires présentés par divers savants à l'Académie des inscriptions et belles-lettres de l'Institut de France. Première série, Sujets divers d'érudition. Tome 15, 1e partie, 1960. pp. 197-349. DOI : https://doi.org/10.3406/mesav.1960.1129
 Fitzmyer, J. (1961). The Aramaic Inscriptions of Sefire I and II. Journal of the American Oriental Society, 81(3), 178-222. doi:10.2307/595652
 Greenfield, Jonas C., "Three Notes on the Sefire Inscription," JSS 11 (1966), 98-105.

8th-century BC steles
1930 archaeological discoveries
1956 archaeological discoveries
Ancient Near East steles
Aramaic texts
Victory steles
Archaeological artifacts
Ancient Near East
Inscriptions
Aramaic inscriptions
KAI inscriptions
Aleppo Governorate
Archaeological discoveries in Syria
El (deity)